Dimaculangan is a Filipino surname. Notable people with the surname include:

 Ney Dimaculangan (born 1982), Filipino musician
 Rhea Dimaculangan (born 1991), Filipina volleyball player

Tagalog-language surnames